The Champion Schools tournament (known as the Carnegie Champion Schools due to sponsorship) is a full contact knock-out rugby league football competition open to every secondary school in England, Scotland and Wales and is the largest rugby league tournament in the World "RFL-13-05-07" The competition is operated by the Rugby Football League (RFL) and the English Schools Rugby League (ESRL). There are competitions for boys and girls in school year groups 7-11, pupil ages 11–16.

The competition began in 1981 and was re-launched in 2002 by the RFL in partnership with English Schools Rugby League. The ESRL credit the Champion Schools tournament with having "rejuvenated schools rugby". The RFL believe "this competition has played a vital role in introducing Rugby League to an ever increasing number of young people throughout the United Kingdom". The Champion Schools tournament is the largest knock-out rugby league tournament in the world.

Most of the finals were held at RAF Uxbridge up until 2009, in 2010 and 2011 at Hillingdon sports and athletics complex. Then in 2012, to avoid a clash with the London Olympics, the finals moved north to Odsal Stadium, Bradford and then since 2013 at Richmond athletic stadium (home of London Scottish RFU). The Year 7 boys finalists however have maintained the privilege of playing the curtain raiser at Wembley ahead of the Rugby League Challenge Cup Final. The Year 7 boys finals have also in the past been played at the Millennium Stadium and Twickenham. National finalists from all age groups parade around Wembley in their school uniforms and watch the Challenge Cup Final as guests of the Rugby Football League.

Rules
In the event of a drawn match in a knock-out round before the final, the team that has scored the most tries will be declared the winner. If both teams have scored an equal number of tries the visiting team will progress in the competition. If a final is drawn, the trophy will be shared by both teams with each having it for 6 months.

Boys
All boys games are played at 13-a-side. Year 7 and 8 competition matches are played with two-halves of 25 minutes duration. Years 9, 10 and 11 play for 30-minute halves.

Size 4 balls are used for year 7 and 8 games. Size 5 balls are used for years 9, 10 and 11.

Girls
Girls play 9-a-side rugby league. The girls matches at years 7, 8, 9 and 10 are played with 20 minutes for each half. All girls competitions use a size 4 ball. No conversion attempts are made, the games are tries only. Kicking is allowed in general play, for example punts and grubber kicks, but secondary kicking, such as dribbling, is not. Passive scrums consisting of 5 players per team are used. One-on-one tackles are not permitted.

History
The present Champion Schools competitions began in 1981. Before that, Regional Champion School Competitions were held. Many of the Yorkshire Schools' competition records have been lost but the Lancashire Schools' (North West Counties) records go back to the beginning of the Champion School Competition in 1926. St. Patrick's (Wigan) played St. Bede's (Widnes) in that 1926 final at Central Park before a crowd of 20,000. St. Patrick's won 6–3 to become Lancashire's champion school.

In academic year 2006/7 over 1,500 teams and 25,000 players competed. Andy Harland, the RFL's National Development Manager, stated: "Since 2002/2003 season more than 80,000 pupils have played in this tournament, so this year we expect to break the 100,000 barrier which is a huge achievement not only for rugby league but sport in this country".

In 2007, the ESRL fixture secretary, Ron England, noted how the tournament had provided a focus to spreading the sport to more schools. The link to Wembley is cited as one factor in the success of the competition. Another factor highlighted is the enthusiasm of teachers which is considered a driving force. The schools are linked into their local service area and professional clubs. Mr England was positive about the future performance of Welsh and London schools: "They're at a terrific standard". England stated his belief that the best boys' schools teams were playing to a higher standard than in the past, "I think the best individual schools now are at a level that the old district teams were at four or five years ago. Schools have got more ambitious and there's a strong link with the service areas and professional scholarships ... as for the girls, we are seeing the talent emerge and we are now attracting a whole new concept and depth to the development of girls quality competition."

In 2008/09, a 1,678 teams took part in the tournament – an increase of 175 from the previous year. 27,537 students participated. Castleford High School has been a dominant force in the tournament since its re-launch, in 2009 the school fielded 6 teams in the national finals for the third year in succession.

Format

Boys
Teams play in local competitions before playing regional ones if they qualify, followed by national stages.

Girls
Teams progress from regional stages to a national festival for which qualifiers are divided into two groups. The groups play round-robin matches with the winners and runners up from each group progressing to the competition semi-finals and then final.

Subsidiary competitions
Local and regional stages of the competition decide champions titles at those levels, City Champions for Birmingham at each age group, will for example, progress next to the West Midlands Finals stage. Later, the West Midlands champions will meet their East Midlands counterparts before the winners of those encounters move on to the competition's national stage.

Wales Schools Cup
One of the major subsidiary competitions of the Champion Schools is the  Wales Schools Cup. All schools in Wales entering the Champion Schools competition also compete for this Cup during the Wales Schools Finals Day. At each age group, both finalists for the Wales Schools Cup progress to the national stages of the Champion Schools.

The inaugural Wales Schools Cup was held in 2008, the finals were played at Brewery Field in Bridgend.

2005/06 National Finals Results

2006/07 National Finals Results

2007/08 National Finals Results

2008/09 National Finals Results

2009/10 National Finals Results

2012/13 National Finals Results

New Champion Colleges competition

The successful growth of the Champion Schools tournament has led to the creation of the Carnegie Champion Colleges competition for Years 12 and 13. The regionally based competition was introduced in 2008 and started in January.

See also

 Champion Colleges competition
 Junior rugby league in England
 Rugby league in England
 Rugby league in Scotland
 Rugby league in Wales

References

In-line

General
 

Rugby league competitions in the United Kingdom
School sport in the United Kingdom
Junior rugby league
Youth sport in England
Youth sport in Scotland
Youth sport in Wales
1981 establishments in England
Recurring sporting events established in 1981